USNS Hayes (T-AGOR-16/T-AG-195) was a Hayes-class oceanographic research ship acquired by the U.S. Navy in 1971.  In 1992 she was reconfigured as an acoustics research ship and assigned to the Navy's program of acoustic noise reduction for submarines.

Built at Seattle, Washington
Hayes was built in Seattle, Washington, by Todd Shipyards, Corp., and was laid down on 12 November 1969 and launched on 2 July 1970. She was named after Dr. Harvey C. Hayes, a pioneer in underwater acoustics and the former head of the US Navy Sound Division of Naval Research Laboratory.  She was delivered to the Navy 21 July 1971 and placed in service by the Military Sealift Command (MSC) as USNS Hayes (T-AGOR-16). After completing service with the MSC, she was placed into Ready Reserve 10 June 1983. In 1984 Hayes was laid up in the National Defense Reserve Fleet, James River, Fort Eustis, Virginia.

Conversion to acoustics research ship
Hayes was reacquired by the Navy during fiscal year 1986 and was converted into an Acoustic Research Ship at Tacoma Boatbuilding Company, Tacoma, Washington. MSC placed the ship back into service in 1992, this time as USNS Hayes (T-AG-195).  

Hayes was equipped in 1994 with one-of-a-kind sensor arrays, including three acoustic deploy-able buoys from each of which were suspended a custom designed seven hundred channel High Frequency Baffled Cylindrical Array designed and built by the Westinghouse Oceanic Division of Annapolis, MD; and a Low Frequency Array of vertical line arrays designed and constructed by SAIC of McLean, Virginia.  Each buoy provided over 1500 acoustic channels of information that required extensive processing by two Cray IV computers also custom designed for the application.   The arrays and computer created a fully steerable sensor suit that could isolate noise sources in the submarines and assist in determining the source of excessive noise emitted by the submarine.

Submarines to be used for test and development, and to be quietened by engineers using the data from the Hayes, would pass submerged through the three buoy arrays in the deep waters off Andros Island, Bahamas.

History of operations
Hayes was assigned to underwater acoustics research for the purpose of reducing the acoustic noise of underwater submarines.  She was struck from the Naval Register in 2008 and laid up at the Philadelphia Naval Shipyard.

Note
There is no history of Hayes’ operations in DANFS.

See also 
 United States Navy
 Sonar

References

 NavSource Online: Service Ship Photo Archive - USNS Hayes (T-AG-195) – ex - USNS Hates (T-AGOR-16) (1971 - 1992)
The USNS Hayes - A New Dimension in Ocean Research (part 1)
The USNS Hayes - A New Dimension in Ocean Research (part 2)
Naval Vessel Historical Evaluation - USNS Hayes - 2011

Ships built in Seattle
1970 ships
Oceanographic research ships of the United States Navy
Anti-submarine warfare
Military catamarans